Bartholomew County is a county located in the U.S. state of Indiana. The population was 82,208 at the 2020 census. The county seat is Columbus. The county was determined by the U.S. Census Bureau to be home to the mean center of U.S. population in 1900.

Bartholomew County makes up the Columbus, Indiana Metropolitan Statistical Area, which is part of the Indianapolis-Carmel-Muncie Combined Statistical Area.

History
Bartholomew County was formed on February 12, 1821, and was named for Lt. Col. Joseph Bartholomew, wounded at the Battle of Tippecanoe. The site of the county seat was chosen on February 15, 1821, by a team of commissioners, who suggested the name Tiptona, in honor of John Tipton.

Courthouse

The current Bartholomew County courthouse was built from 1870 to 1874 by McCormack and Sweeney of Columbus at a cost of $225,000.

It was designed by architect Isaac Hodgson, who was born in Belfast, Ireland in 1826 and immigrated to the United States in 1848; he designed six Indiana courthouses, including the one in Henry County.

The courthouse is built largely of brick and has mansard roofs typical of the Second Empire French style.  Its asymmetrical "L" shape allows it to face two major streets in Columbus.  The inscription indicating the commissioners, architect and date is high up on the east facade.

Today the Bartholomew County Veterans Memorial designed by American architect Charles Rose sits adjacent to the Courthouse.

Geography

Camp Atterbury occupies the northwestern corner of the county.

Adjacent counties
 Johnson County (northwest)
 Shelby County (northeast)
 Decatur County (east)
 Jennings County (southeast)
 Jackson County (south)
 Brown County (west)

City
 Columbus

Towns
 Clifford
 Edinburgh
 Elizabethtown
 Hartsville
 Hope
 Jonesville

Census-designated place
 Taylorsville

Other unincorporated places

 Azalia
 Bethany
 Burnsville
 Corn Brook
 Everroad Park
 Flat Rock Park
 Garden City
 Grammer
 Grandview Lake
 Jewell Village
 Lowell
 Mount Healthy
 Newbern
 North Columbus
 North Gate
 North Ogilville
 Northcliff
 Nortonburg
 Ogilville
 Old Saint Louis
 Parkside
 Petersville
 Pleasant View Village
 Rosstown
 Rugby
 Saint Louis Crossing
 Stony Lonesome
 Walesboro
 Waymansville
 Waynesville

Extinct towns
 Kansas

Townships

 Clay
 Clifty
 Columbus
 Flat Rock
 German
 Harrison
 Haw Creek
 Jackson
 Ohio
 Rock Creek
 Sand Creek
 Wayne

Major highways

  Interstate 65
  U.S. Route 31
  State Road 7
  State Road 9
  State Road 11
  State Road 46
  State Road 58

Airport
 KBAK - Columbus Municipal Airport

Railroads
 Louisville and Indiana Railroad

Climate and weather 

Government

Politics
The county government is a constitutional body, and is granted specific powers by the Constitution of Indiana, and by the Indiana Code.

County Council: The county council is the legislative branch of the county government and controls all the spending and revenue collection in the county. Representatives are elected from county districts. The council members serve four-year terms. They are responsible for setting salaries, the annual budget, and special spending. The council also has limited authority to impose local taxes, in the form of an income and property tax that is subject to state level approval, excise taxes, and service taxes.

Board of Commissioners: The executive body of the county is made of a board of commissioners. The commissioners are elected county-wide, in staggered terms, and each serves a four-year term. One of the commissioners, typically the most senior, serves as president. The commissioners are charged with executing the acts legislated by the council, collecting revenue, and managing the day-to-day functions of the county government.

Court: The county maintains a small claims court that can handle some civil cases. The judge on the court is elected to a term of four years and must be a member of the Indiana Bar Association. The judge is assisted by a constable who is also elected to a four-year term. In some cases, court decisions can be appealed to the state level circuit court.

County Officials: The county has several other elected offices, including sheriff, coroner, auditor, treasurer, recorder, surveyor, and circuit court clerk. Each of these elected officers serves a term of four years and oversees a different part of county government. Members elected to county government positions are required to declare a party affiliation and to be residents of the county.

Bartholomew County is part of Indiana's 6th congressional district and Indiana's 9th congressional district; Indiana Senate district 41; and Indiana House of Representatives districts 57, 59 and 65.

Demographics

As of the 2020 United States Census, there were 82,208 people and 31,452 households residing in the county. Per the 2020 census, the racial makeup of the county was 80.0% white, 6.6% Asian, 2.2% black or African American, 0.4% American Indian, 0.1% Pacific islander, 4.7% from other races, and 6.1% from two or more races. Those of Hispanic or Latino origin made up 8.8% of the population. In terms of ancestry, according the 2010 census, 28.5% were German, 12.4% were English, 12.2% were Irish, and 10.7% were American.

Of the 29,860 households in 2010, 34.6% had children under the age of 18 living with them, 54.1% were married couples living together, 10.7% had a female householder with no husband present, 30.4% were non-families, and 25.3% of all households were made up of individuals. The average household size was 2.53 and the average family size was 3.02. The median age was 38.2 years.

In 2010, the median income for a household in the county was $47,697 and the median income for a family was $64,024. Males had a median income of $50,358 versus $32,334 for females; the per capita income for the county was $26,860; and approximately 7.7% of families and 10.4% of the population were below the poverty line, including 15.8% of those under age 18 and 5.3% of those age 65 or over.

Education
Public schools in Bartholomew County are administered by the Bartholomew Consolidated School Corporation and the Flat Rock-Hawcreek School Corporation.  The county's first tuition-free public charter school, the International School of Columbus, a middle school/high school, opened in 2009–10.  The ISC was an International Baccalaureate World School offering the Diploma Program. The ISC closed due to financial difficulties in the fall of 2013.

Ivy Tech Community College Columbus is located in Bartholomew County.

See also
 The Republic, daily newspaper covering Bartholomew County
 National Register of Historic Places listings in Bartholomew County, Indiana

References

External links

 Bartholomew County official website
 Bartholomew Consolidated School Corporation
 Flat Rock-Hawcreek School Corporation
 International School of Columbus

 
Indiana counties
1821 establishments in Indiana
Populated places established in 1821